The 2010 Oschersleben Formula Two round was the eighth round of the 2010 FIA Formula Two Championship and was held from September 4 and 5, 2010 at the Motorsport Arena Oschersleben, Oschersleben, Germany. Dean Stoneman won the first race on September 4, which took place over a distance of 24 laps, from fifth place. Kazim Vasiliauskas finished second and Jolyon Palmer took third. Stoneman won the second 23-lap event on 5 September from pole position. Vasiliauskas placed second and Sergey Afanasyev was third.

Classification

Qualifying 1

Qualifying 2

Race 1

Race 2

References

FIA Formula Two Championship